John Frederic Beriah Moore (25 December 1919 – 2005) was a Welsh professional footballer. A winger, he played for Cardiff City F.C. and scored the only goal for Cardiff in a friendly against Moscow Dynamo in 1945 (final score 10–1). In 1950 he joined Newport County from Bangor City F.C. and went on to make 121 appearances for the club, scoring 45 goals. In 1953 he rejoined Bangor City. In later life he became a director of Bangor and died in his eighties (precise date unknown).

References

External links

Welsh footballers
Cardiff City F.C. players
Newport County A.F.C. players
English Football League players
1919 births
2005 deaths
Date of death missing
Footballers from Cardiff
Bangor City F.C. players
Association football wingers